Godfrey Reggio (born March 29, 1940) is an American director of experimental documentary films.

Life
Godfrey Reggio is an American creator of a unique experimental cinematic poetry. He was born in New Orleans in 1940 of a Catholic family lineage established in French Louisiana near 1750. From a soulful beginning in the Church at the age of 14, Reggio passed the ensuing twenty-two years in fasting, long periods of meditative silence, of prayer, vows of life-long poverty, and in choosing to be a monk-friar. It was this ascetic traditional Roman Catholic pontifical teaching Order which ultimately assigned him to the province of Santa Fe, New Mexico. During that ensuing period of his life Reggio served as a teacher at a parochial grade school, a secondary school, and on the faculty of the Christian Brothers College in Santa Fe. Witnessing himself in the secular world as a young intellectually zealous monk schooled in the theology of the middle ages, he accepted nothing, questioned everything, even eventually to the structure of the Church.

Following a spiritual crux concerning personal liberation and social activism, Reggio ultimately left the Pontifical Congregation, Ex Claustrum, in 1968, and thereafter helped found the Institute for Regional Education in Santa Fe, a non-profit foundation focused on civil rights, environmental concerns, media development, radically innovative arts, community organization, and social research. He became a founder of La Clinica de la Gente  a facility providing medical care and service to 12,000 community members in northern New Mexico's barrios,as well as founding the Young Citizens for Action, a city-wide project aiding juveniles in the street gangs of Santa Fe. He then began working with the American Civil Liberties Union, co-organizing a novel public interest campaign on the technological invasion of privacy, the negative impacts of consumerism, and the increasing use of scientific knowledge and the potency of media to control and shape popular behavior. Godfrey Reggio participated in the Stock Exchange of Visions project in 2006.

Filmmaker
Reggio’s grasp of the subjective power of visual imagery, from the most ancient times, led to his appreciation of the “moving picture” whereby cinematic art had become a consciousness-altering tool. This began his lifelong career in filmmaking. Reggio relates that a singular event brought him to his profession in motion-pictures. As a religious man, he had refrained from attending movies, feeling that although he was in the world, he was not of it. But another brother showed him the film Los Olvidados by Luis Bunuel saying it might change his life. It did so. Understanding it had less to do with entertainment, but with right outreach effort, it revealed an artistic path to him, an experience he had never had before. Missionizing the film to the street gangs he worked among, cinema appeared to be like a church with tremendous impact on those who see it. He claims it was an epiphany to realize the psychological power of a moving image, the motion picture, and thus launched his world-famous career.

Today, Reggio is widely known throughout the world for his wordless filmography, especially the pre- eminent trilogy of Koyaanisqatsi: “Life Out of Balance”; Powaqqatsi: “Life in Transformation”; and Naqoyqatsi: “Life as War”. The film titles are taken from the Hopi language. These three films portray an apocalyptic vision of the collision between urban life and the global environment. They reveal a humanist philosophy about our planet, the encroachment of technology on nature, ancient cultures, and the splendor that disappears as a result. They chronicle the impact of the modernizing world on our physical and psychological environment. His short film feature titled Evidence  was a penetrating display of the effect of cinema on the minds of children, and his moving documentary Anima Mundi, funded by the World Wildlife Fund, revealed how much we share the planet with other creatures, a montage of intimate images of over seventy animal species that celebrates the magnificence and variety of the world's fauna. His film Visitors, which premiered at the Toronto International Film Festival, provided a unique glimpse of how space aliens might perceive human beings, consisting for the most part of extended slow-motion closeups of people's faces, looking directly into the camera.

Reggio’s latest film, Once Within A Time, was produced by Steven Soderbergh & Alexander Rodnyansky and had its world premiere at Santa Fe International Film Festival (SFiFF) in October 2022. Remarkably unlike so many others in the film industry, Reggio has never personally made any money, or received any royalties or payments from his cinematography.

All of the musical and orchestral soundtracks augmenting and embracing Reggio’s wordless films were created in mutual trust with his lifelong friend and collaborator, the great and eminent composer Philip Glass.

In 2014, Reggio was recognized by the Museum of Arts and Design in New York City with a full career retrospective titled Life with Technology: The Cinema of Godfrey Reggio.

Reggio received the Santa Fe International Film Festival Lifetime Achievement Award on Oct. 22, 2022.

Filmography

References

External links 
 Qatsi trilogy homepage
 
 
 Stock Exchange Of Visions: Visions of Godfrey Reggio
 Godfrey Reggio discusses his influences 
 Godfrey Reggio's The Holy See
 The Brian Lehrer Show - A Visit with Godfrey Reggio, January 23, 2014
 Godfrey Reggio: 'My Che Guevara was Pope John XXIII' (Guardian, March 27, 2014)

American documentary filmmakers
American film directors
American people of French descent
American writers of Italian descent
American male screenwriters
American experimental filmmakers
1940 births
Living people
Artists from New Orleans
Writers from New Orleans
Screenwriters from Louisiana
American people of Italian descent